Shelter Island is approximately  due west of Albany, Western Australia. 

It is often mistakenly referred to as Muttonbird Island, which is the much smaller island located immediately east of Shelter Island. The beach immediately west of Shelter Island is known as Muttonbird Beach, and is popular for swimming, surfing, fishing, and four wheel driving.

The island consists of a mass of granite but has sufficient soil for plant growth and is well vegetated on top. The island supports breeding populations of flesh-footed shearwaters and little penguins as well as small populations of feral cats and black rats.

Little penguins have also been seen on the island.

It was declared a Class 1A Nature Reserve in 1973.

References

Nature reserves in Western Australia
Islands of the Great Southern (Western Australia)